Yosyp (Osyp) Ivanovych Bezpalko (born 1881, Czernowitz (today Chernivtsi), d. 1950 in Kazakh SSR) was a Ukrainian politician and writer from Northern Bukovina.

Biography 
He was born in Chernivtsi, Northern Bukovina to a poor middle-class family.

Due to political activity, he was expelled from the gymnasium. In 1899, he founded a secret group of high school and student youth. From 1901 to 1902 he edited the Bukovina newspaper, a body of the Bukovinian national organization. In 1903, he began teaching. Founder of one of the first Sich societies (which promoted physical education and fire-fighting organization) in Bukovina and editor of the teacher's magazine Promin (1903). From 1907 to 1908 he was the regional secretary of the Bukovina trade unions.

In 1907—1914 he was the founder and chairman of the regional organization of the Ukrainian Social Democratic Party (USDP) in Bukovina, and in 1908—1914 he was the editor of a local party body, the Borba newspaper.

In 1915—1916 he was the chairman of the educational commission in the camp for Ukrainian prisoners of war (Rastatt, Germany).

Delegate to the Ukrainian National Council of Bukovina and the Western Ukrainian People's Republic — Western Ukraine-Western Ukrainian People's Republic (December 1918 — April 1919), USDRP (1919), Labor Congress, in November 1918 — Commissioner of Chernivtsi. He disagreed with Semyon Vityk, supported by Symon Petliura, on the reorganization of the system of public administration under the leadership of the dictator of the Western Ukrainian People's Republic Yevhen Petrushevych. In 1919—1920, he was Minister of Labor in the governments of Borys Martos and Isaak Mazepa.

On February 11, 1920, in Kamianets-Podilskyi, he was arrested by the Polish authorities together with representatives of the UPR government Isaak Mazepa, Andriy Livytsky, and Ivan Ogienko in accordance with the order of the Polish Chief Commissioner of Volhynia and the Podolsk Front A. Minkevych. An official apology for the "unfortunate case" of the arrest was issued by the Polish Foreign Ministry on March 11 to the Ukrainian diplomatic mission in Warsaw.

In 1920 he emigrated to Czechoslovakia, taught German at the Ukrainian Academy of Economics in Podebrady (Czech Republic). Author of scientific research on the history of Ukrainian-German relations. Author of numerous political articles, intelligence on German-Slavic relations in the early XIX century.

In 1938 he was elected chairman of the Ukrainian Sich Union.

In 1947 he was captured by the secret services of the USSR, sent to the Soviet Union and repressed by the NKVD of the USSR. He died in a concentration camp (Kazakhstan).

References

External links
Yosyp Bezpalko at Encyclopedia of Ukraine
Yosyp Bezpalko at Encyclopedia of History of Ukraine

Members of the Executive of the Labour and Socialist International
1881 births
1950 deaths
Politicians from Chernivtsi
People from the Duchy of Bukovina
Ukrainian Austro-Hungarians
Ukrainian Social Democratic Labour Party politicians
Ukrainian Social Democratic Party (1899) politicians
Labor ministers of Ukraine
Ukrainian educational theorists
People who died in the Gulag